Tetragonoderus intermixtus is a species of beetle in the family Carabidae. It was described by Henry Walter Bates in 1883.

References

intermixtus
Beetles described in 1883